Kenny Davis (born September 4, 1961) is an American jazz bassist.

Davis released two albums as leader for Soul Note.

He was also member of the Blue Note Records group Out of the Blue and has appeared on albums by Gary Bartz, Art Farmer, Don Byron, Eric Person, Michele Rosewoman, Onaje Allan Gumbs and others.

Kenny is currently professor of Jazz Bass and Jazz History at the Mason Gross School of the Arts at Rutgers University in New Brunswick, New Jersey.

Discography

As sideman
With Geri Allen
Geri Allen & Timeline Live (Motema, 2010)
With Cecil Brooks III
Hangin' with Smooth (Muse, 1990)
With Uri Caine
Sphere Music (JMT, 1993)
With James Carter
Caribbean Rhapsody (EmArcy, 2011)
With Steve Coleman
The Tao of Mad Phat (Novus, 1993)
With Robin Eubanks
Mental Images (JMT, 1994)
With Art Farmer
The Company I Keep (Arabesque, 1994) with Tom Harrell
The Meaning of Art (Arabesque, 1995)
Silk Road (Arabesque, 1997)
With Cassandra Wilson
Blue Light 'til Dawn (Blue Note, 1993)

Earl MacDonald, "Re:Visions - works for jazz orchestra", Death Defying Records, 2010
Carla Cook, Simply Natural, Maxjazz 2002
Regina Carter, Something for Grace, Atlantic, 1997
Steve Coleman & Five Elements, The TAO of Mad Phat Fringed Zones, Novus, 1993
Out of the Blue, O.T.B Live at Mt. Fuji Jazz Festival, O.T.B/Blue Note, 1986

References

1961 births
Living people
American jazz double-bassists
Male double-bassists
Black Saint/Soul Note artists
Musicians from Chicago
Jazz musicians from Illinois
21st-century double-bassists
21st-century American male musicians
American male jazz musicians
The Tonight Show Band members
Hasidic New Wave members
Out of the Blue (American band) members